Hysteroconcha lupanaria is a species of marine bivalve mollusc in the family Veneridae, the Venus clams.

Description
The shell of this species is unusual in that it has a double series of long, curved spines on the posterior slope of each valve. A closely related species which occurs in the Western Atlantic is Pitar dione.

Distribution
This species is found in the Eastern Pacific Ocean.

References

 Huber, M. (2010). Compendium of bivalves. A full-color guide to 3,300 of the world's marine bivalves. A status on Bivalvia after 250 years of research. Hackenheim: ConchBooks. 901 pp., 1 CD-ROM.
  Coan, E. V.; Valentich-Scott, P. (2012). Bivalve seashells of tropical West America. Marine bivalve mollusks from Baja California to northern Peru. 2 vols, 1258 pp.

External links
  Reeve, L. A. (1863-1864). Monograph of the genus Dione. In: Conchologia Iconica, or, illustrations of the shells of molluscous animals, vol. 14, pls. 1-12 and unpaginated text. L. Reeve & Co., London.
 

lupanaria
Bivalves described in 1831
Taxa named by René Lesson